The Eurovision Song Contest 1961 was the 6th edition of the annual Eurovision Song Contest. Organised by the European Broadcasting Union (EBU) and host broadcaster Radiodiffusion-Télévision Française (RTF), the contest was again held at the Palais des Festivals et des Congrès on Saturday 18 March 1961, becoming the first contest to take place on a Saturday evening, a tradition that has continued ever since (with the exception of 1962). The show was again hosted by Jacqueline Joubert, who had also hosted in 1959.

Location 

The event took place in Cannes, France, following the nation's victory at the 1960 edition with the song "", performed by Jacqueline Boyer. It also hosted the  edition of the Eurovision Song Contest.

Format 
The stage used for the 1961 contest was notably larger than in previous years and was decorated with flowers. It is noticeable that during the voting, Luxembourg gave the UK eight points, and Norway also gave Denmark eight points. It was the largest number of points given to a country by a single jury since 1958, when Denmark provided France with nine points. Such a high number of points obtained by a country would not be achieved until 1970, when Ireland would receive nine points from Belgium.

Participating countries 

Interest in the competition began to grow across Europe as three new countries participated for the first time: Finland, Spain, and Yugoslavia.

Conductors 
Each performance had a conductor who directed the orchestra.

 Rafael Ferrer
 Raymond Lefèvre
 Franck Pourcel
 George de Godzinsky
 Jože Privšek
 Dolf van der Linden
 
 Franck Pourcel
 Franck Pourcel
 Fernando Paggi
 Francis Bay
 Øivind Bergh
 Kai Mortensen
 Léo Chauliac
 Harry Robinson
 Gianfranco Intra

Returning artists

Participants and results

Detailed voting results 

Each country had 10 jury members who each awarded 1 point to their favourite song.

Spokespersons 

Listed below is the order in which votes were cast during the 1961 contest along with the spokesperson who was responsible for announcing the votes for their respective country.

 Enzo Tortora
 Michael Aspel
 TBC
 
 Mette Janson
 Ward Bogaert
 
 Armand Lanoux
 Heinz Schenk
 
 
 Saša Novak
 
 Emil Kollpacher
 TBC

Broadcasts 

Each participating broadcaster was required to relay the contest via its networks. Non-participating EBU member broadcasters were also able to relay the contest as "passive participants". Broadcasters were able to send commentators to provide coverage of the contest in their own native language and to relay information about the artists and songs to their television viewers.

Known details on the broadcasts in each country, including the specific broadcasting stations and commentators are shown in the tables below.

References

Bibliography

External links

 
1961
Music festivals in France
1961 in music
1961 in France
Events in Cannes
March 1961 events in Europe